Vasily Ivanovich Maykov (Василий Иванович Майков, 1728, Yaroslavl, Russian Empire,  - 28 June 1778, Moscow, Russian Empire) — was a Russian poet, fabulist, playwright and translator, an exponent of the mock-heroic poetry genre in Russia.

As a playwright Maykov followed the tradition set by Alexander Sumarokov but, alongside heroic tragedies (Agriope, Агриопа, 1775) wrote some comedies too (The Country Holiday or a Rewarded Virtue, Деревенский праздник, или Увенчанная добродетель, 1777), occasionally mixing the two genres. As a lyrical poet he is said to have provided a link between the two eras in the Russian poetry, that of Mikhail Lomonosov on the one hand and Gavriil Derzhavin, on another. What Maykov really excelled at, though, was ironic verse, and it was the comedy The Ombre Player (Игрок ломбера) that made him famous in 1763.

The Works by V.I.Maykov were first compiled in 1809, to be revised and re-issued by Pyotr Yefremov in 1867. In the USSR The Selected Works by V.I. Maykov were published in 1966 by Sovetsky Pisatel.

References 

People from Yaroslavl
1728 births
1778 deaths
Dramatists and playwrights from the Russian Empire
Poets from the Russian Empire
Male writers from the Russian Empire
Russian male poets
18th-century poets from the Russian Empire
18th-century dramatists and playwrights
Russian male dramatists and playwrights
18th-century male writers